The 1939–40 season was the 42nd in the history of the Southern League. The league was split into two sections, Eastern and Western as part of an emergency war-time competition. Chelmsford City won the Eastern Section and Lovell's Athletic won the Western one. A championship play-off between the two clubs was drawn 3–3 and they were declared joint champions. After this season, the Southern Football League did not resume until World War II had ended in 1945.

Eastern Section

Western Section

The Western Section featured three new clubs:
 Gloucester City
 Hereford United
 Lovell's Athletic

References

1939-40
4
1939–40 in Welsh football